Fuscapex is a genus of sea snails, marine gastropod mollusks in the family Eulimidae.

Species
Species within this genus include the following:
 Fuscapex baptocephalus (Dautzenberg & Fischer., 1896)
 Fuscapex cabiochi (Bouchet & Warén, 1986)
 Fuscapex major (Bouchet & Warén, 1986)
 Fuscapex microcostellatus (Bouchet & Warén, 1986)
 Fuscapex ophioacanthicola (Warén, 1981)
 Fuscapex talismani (Bouchet & Warén, 1986)
Species brought into synonymy
 Fuscapex microcostellata Bouchet & Warén, 1986: synonym of Fuscapex microcostellatus Bouchet & Warén, 1986

References

 Gofas, S.; Le Renard, J.; Bouchet, P. (2001). Mollusca. in: Costello, M.J. et al. (eds), European Register of Marine Species: a check-list of the marine species in Europe and a bibliography of guides to their identification. Patrimoines Naturels. 50: 180-213

External links
 To World Register of Marine Species
 Warén A. 1981. Eulimid gastropods parasitic on Echinoderms in the New Zealand region. New Zealand Journal of Zoology, 8(2): 313-324

Eulimidae